Frederick Harold Pemberton (22 May 1923 – 10 December 2007) was an Australian rules footballer who played with St Kilda in the Victorian Football League (VFL).

Prior to playing for St Kilda he served in World War II.

He later played with Eastern Suburbs and Western Suburbs in the Sydney AFL competition before playing for Glenelg in the SANFL in 1959.

He died in Canberra in 2007.

Notes

External links 

1923 births
Australian rules footballers from Victoria (Australia)
St Kilda Football Club players
Glenelg Football Club players
2007 deaths